Pavel Serg. Savvich (Russian, Павел Сергеевич Саввич, 15 February 1857 – 1917) was an Imperial Russian regimental, division and corps commander. He served twice as governor of Kiev Governorate in modern-day Ukraine.

Awards
Order of Saint Anna, 4th class, 1877
Order of Saint Stanislaus (House of Romanov), 3rd class, 1878
Order of Saint Anna, 3rd class, 1879
Order of Saint Stanislaus (House of Romanov), 2nd class, 1879
Order of Saint Anna, 2nd class, 1885
Order of Saint Vladimir, 4th class, 1894
Order of Saint Vladimir, 3rd class, 1896
Order of Saint Stanislaus (House of Romanov), 1st class, 1902
Order of Saint Anna, 1st class, 1907
Order of Saint Vladimir, 2nd class, 1911
Order of the White Eagle (Russian Empire), 1914

References
 Современная Россия в портретах и биографиях выдающихся деятелей. — Санкт-Петербург, 1904. — С. 100.

Russian military personnel of the Russo-Turkish War (1877–1878)
Recipients of the Order of St. Anna, 4th class
Recipients of the Order of Saint Stanislaus (Russian), 3rd class
Recipients of the Order of St. Anna, 3rd class
Recipients of the Order of Saint Stanislaus (Russian), 2nd class
Recipients of the Order of St. Anna, 2nd class
Recipients of the Order of St. Vladimir, 4th class
Recipients of the Order of St. Vladimir, 3rd class
Recipients of the Order of Saint Stanislaus (Russian), 1st class
Recipients of the Order of St. Anna, 1st class
Recipients of the Order of St. Vladimir, 2nd class
Recipients of the Order of the White Eagle (Russia)
1857 births
1917 deaths